The Delaware Valley Regional Planning Commission (DVRPC) is the metropolitan planning organization for the Delaware Valley. Created in 1965 by an interstate compact, DVRPC is responsible for transportation and regional planning in the greater Philadelphia area.

History
The first evidence of regional planning in the Delaware Valley was in the form of the Regional Planning Federation of the Philadelphia Tri-State District, which was formed in 1928 and which issued the first regional plan in 1932. The agency was disbanded in 1941.

Philadelphia's Urban Traffic and Transportation Board may be the next link, producing Plan and Program 1955. This agency was followed by the Penn Jersey Transportation Study which was organized to resume regional planning and which metamorphosed into the Delaware Valley Regional Planning Commission (DVRPC).

DVRPC role 
The role of the DVRPC is to gather elected officials and government planners to improve transportation, promote smart growth initiatives, and protect the environment. The commission was first instituted as a regional planning agency in 1965 under a contract between Pennsylvania and New Jersey. In 1967, it was formally established under the "Delaware Valley Urban Compact" to provide continuing, comprehensive, coordinated regional planning for the Delaware Valley Urban Area and to provide a variety of services designed to address regional issues and needs.  The structure, authority, purpose and administrative procedures of DVRPC were defined, via thi compact, by the legislatures of both states. DVRPC was subsequently designated as the Metropolitan Planning Organization (MPO) for its nine-county planning region and retained this designation through the implementation of the 1991 Intermodal Surface Transportation Efficiency Act (ISTEA). ISTEA gave the commission an expanded transportation planning authority and responsibility, as defined in the USDOT Final Rules for Statewide Planning and Metropolitan Planning. Subsequent federal bills have continued and expanded this designation and responsibility.

The commission is governed by an 18-member board that establishes regional policy, defines committee duties, and adopts the annual work program. A 10-member executive committee oversees general operations and fiscal matters, including adoption of the annual budget.

Right-to-Know ruling

Open secords ruling
On July 19, 2011, the Pennsylvania Office of Open Records (OOR) determined that DVRPC was covered under the Pennsylvania Right-to-Know Law (RTKL) of 2008 and was therefore required to provide access to public records in its possession. DVRPC, in response to several requests for information from the Pennsylvania Transit Expansion Coalition (PA-TEC), had previously argued that it was exempt from the state law, as it was a multi-state agency that did not perform any essential function, despite being funded almost entirely by taxpayers. The OOR overruled DVRPC's assessment, stating that the RTKL eliminated the requirement than an entity perform an essential governmental function in order to be considered an agency. The OOR had further determined that members of PA-TEC, despite repeated attempts to obtain information from DVRPC, had not engaged in disruptive behavior, which the DVRPC stated had “a chilling effect” on citizen participation because they "involve e-mails exchanged with leaders of the RCC, who aren't employees of the commission." The OOR ordered the DVRPC to comply with PA-TEC's request and release all documents the group has requested; DVPRC initially waived its right to appeal the decision in Commonwealth court.

The ruling had serious consequences concerning the workings of the DVRPC. Documents produced by the DVRPC were presumed public, resulting in the commission only able to refuse the release documents under certain narrow exceptions spelled out in the RTKL. PlanPhilly.com called the decision "a landmark ruling."

Commonwealth Court of Pennsylvania ruling
The DVRPC eventually appealed the ruling to the Commonwealth Court of Pennsylvania, who overturned the OOR decision on October 3, 2012, on the basis that the planning organization "is not a 'commonwealth agency' under the Law because it does not perform an essential governmental function."

Regional Citizens Committee 
The Regional Citizens Committee (RCC) initially came into being in the mid-1970s as the result of a federal mandate; it was initially structured as three committees focusing on the issues of transportation, housing and the environment. In 1980, the three committees were merged into one and since that time the RCC has functioned as an advisory committee to the Board. In 1984, the RCC Chair was given a seat at the Board table in an advisory capacity.

The RCC was structured to fulfill several goals:
To identify those members of key regional organizations who could convey the message heard at RCC meetings to other individuals, thus building a grassroots consensus for DVRPC initiatives;
To review ongoing DVRPC activities and program and provide input on public policy within the purview of DVRPC; and
To work cooperatively with the Board and staff to implement the public participation requirements mandated by federal transportation legislation.

The RCC was originally composed of citizen members, advocates for special interests, and regional organizations.

In February 2011, RCC President John Pawson was instructed by the DVRPC Executive Committee to step down; he died the following February. On March 8, 2011, members of the RCC were notified by Committee Chairwoman Aissia Richardson that voting rights for members were being revoked on the Action Task Force subcommittee, which votes and comments on transportation projects (Transportation Improvement Program [TIP] Action Items), and had been redistributed to selected members chosen by the RCC executive committee and unknown DVRPC employees. A records request under Pennsylvania State Law by PA-TEC revealed that the reassignment of voting rights was undocumented and done out of public view. This occurred after months of RCC deliberations over SEPTA parking garage projects, commuter rail expansion, and prioritization of transportation funding. Despite several attempts, including a formal right-to-know request, DVRPC did not produce any records documenting the suspension and redistribution of voting rights at the RCC's Action Task Force, or alterations to the federally mandated Public Participation Plan.

The May 17, 2011 meeting opened with Aissia Richardson reading a statement about diversity, Nazi concentration camps, and insisting her name be spelled and pronounced correctly each and every time she was addressed (demanding repeatedly "say my name, say it for the record!"). This was followed with a series of personal attacks against members of PA-TEC by vice chairman Jim Richardson, telling one member "go screw yourself!" and another "the next time this comes up in any context, you and I are gonna talk about it on the sidewalk!" Former RCC member Tom McHugh later commented at the January 27, 2012 DVRPC Board Meeting that PA-TEC members were "villainized by the executive committee."

The DVRPC disbanded the RCC in November 2011 and replaced it with a citizens group. Membership was composed of appointees chosen by member counties and others selected by DVRPC staff.

Food System Plan
In February 2011, DVRPC unveiled "Eating Here: Greater Philadelphia’s Food System Plan" and announced $500,000 in implementation grants at an event at Reading Terminal Market. Attendees included over 100 regional policy makers, farmers, preservation experts, hunger advocates, and small business owners. The Plan is the result of a two-year collaborative effort to provide recommendations to increase the security and economic, social, and environmental benefits of the regional food system.

DVRPC also announced $500,000 in grants, made possible with funding from the William Penn Foundation. DVRPC Board Chair and Montgomery County Commissioner Joe Hoeffel presented "Plate of Distinction" Awards to seven local organizations already working to achieve the recommendations laid out in the plan. These organizations are:
The Common Market
Fair Food
Greensgrow Farms
Metropolitan Area Neighborhood Nutrition Alliance (MANNA)
Pennsylvania Association for Sustainable Agriculture (PASA)
SHARE Food Programs
Weavers Way Community Programs.

Notes
In April 2006, Barry Seymour was selected by the DVRPC Board as the new executive director, replacing John Coscia, who had been the executive director since 1982.

DVRPC currently employs approximately 115 full-time staff.

DVRPC produces a long range plan every five years. The current long range plan is titled Connections, the Long-Range Plan for a Sustainable Future.

Counties served
New Jersey
Burlington
Camden
Gloucester
Mercer

Pennsylvania
Bucks
Chester
Delaware
Montgomery
Philadelphia

References

External links
Official website
Connections, the Long-Range Plan for a Sustainable Future
Classic Towns of Greater Philadelphia

Transportation in Pennsylvania
Transportation in New Jersey
Metropolitan planning organizations
Delaware Valley
Local government in Pennsylvania
Local government in New Jersey
State agencies of Pennsylvania
Freedom of information in the United States
1965 establishments in the United States
United States interstate compacts